is a tidal flat in Narashino, Chiba Prefecture, Japan, 2 km from Tokyo Bay. Once a part of the largest tidal flats in Japan, much of the area has been reclaimed. Forty hectares of wetland were designated a Ramsar Site in 1993.

Access
From KEISEI LINE Station Yatsu.
25 minutes walk toward the South. Walk through the shopping road and along the periphery of the tidal flat.

From JR KEIYO LINE Station Minami Funabashi.
20 minutes walk toward the East.  Walk through the pedestrian bridge ROUTE 357 and along the periphery of the tidal flat.

From JR SOUBU LINE Station Tsudanuma. 
Bus (No. 10) to "Tsudanuma Koukou". 10 min. walk toward the West.
Bus (No. 9) to "Yatsu Higata" (Terminal stop) 15 min. walk toward the South.

By Car
Parking lot accommodates 100 cars.
VIA ROUTE 357 from the West (from Tokyo to Chiba)
Pass the intersection Wakamatsu. Parking gate on the left after 1 km.
In the case of highway leave at the interchange (Wangan Chiba).

See also

Ramsar Sites in Japan

References

External links
 Yatsuhigata Nature Observation Center (  previous version of English official web site)

Landforms of Chiba Prefecture
Ramsar sites in Japan
Wetlands of Japan